Red Desert is a 1964 drama film directed by Michelangelo Antonioni and starring Monica Vitti with Richard Harris. Written by Antonioni and Tonino Guerra, it was Antonioni's first color film. The story follows a troubled woman (Vitti) living in an industrial region of Northern Italy following a recent automobile accident.

Red Desert was awarded the Golden Lion at the 25th Venice Film Festival in 1964. It has received acclaim from critics. This was the last in a series of four films he made with Vitti between 1959 and 1964, preceded by L'Avventura (1960), La Notte (1961), and L'Eclisse (1962).

Plot
In Ravenna, Italy, Giuliana is walking with her young son, Valerio, towards the petrochemical plant managed by her husband, Ugo. Passing workers who are on strike, Giuliana nervously and impulsively purchases a half-eaten sandwich from one of the workers. They are surrounded by strange industrial structures and debris that create inhuman images and sounds. Inside the plant, Ugo is speaking with a visiting business associate, Corrado Zeller, who is looking to recruit workers for an industrial operation in Patagonia, Argentina. Ugo and Corrado converse comfortably in the noisy factory when Giuliana arrives.  Ugo introduces Corrado to Giuliana who departs to wait in Ugo's office.

Ugo later tells Corrado that his wife had a recent auto accident, and though she was physically unhurt, she has not been right mentally. That night in their apartment, Giuliana becomes highly agitated and fearful over a dream she had about sinking in quicksand. Ugo is unable to calm her or understand what she's experiencing.

Corrado visits her at an empty shop she's planning to open and talks about his life and the restless nature of his existence. She accompanies him to Ferrara on one of his worker recruitment drives, and she indirectly reveals details about her mental state. She tells him that when she was in the hospital, she met a young woman patient who was advised by her doctors to find someone or something to love. She speaks of the young woman feeling like there was "no ground beneath her, like she was sliding down a slope, sinking, always on the verge of drowning." They travel to a radio observatory in Medicina, where Corrado hopes to recruit a top worker. Surrounded by cold industrial architecture, Giuliana seems lost in her loneliness and isolation.

The following weekend, Giuliana, Ugo, and Corrado are walking beside a polluted estuary when they meet up with another couple, Max and Linda, and together they drive to a small riverside shack at Porto Corsini where they meet Emilia. They spend time in the shack engaged in trivial small talk filled with jokes, role-playing, and sexual innuendo. Giuliana seems to find temporary solace in these mindless distractions. In a dense fog, a mysterious ship docks directly outside their shack. During their conversations, Corrado and Giuliana have grown closer, and he shows interest and sympathy for her. When a doctor arrives to board the ship, Giuliana, seeing that the ship is now quarantined due to an infectious disease, rushes off in a state of panic almost driving off the pier.

Sometime later, Ugo leaves on a business trip, and Giuliana spends more time with Corrado, revealing more about her anxieties. One day, her son becomes suddenly paralyzed from the waist down. Fearing he has contracted polio, Giuliana tries to comfort him with a story about a young girl who lives on an island and swims off a beach at an isolated cove. The girl is at home with her surroundings, but after a mysterious sailing ship approaches offshore, all the rocks of the cove seem to come alive and sing to her in one voice. Soon after, Giuliana discovers to her shock that Valerio was only pretending to be paralyzed. Unable to imagine why her son would do such a cruel thing, Giuliana's sense of loneliness and isolation returns.

Desperate to end her inner turmoil, Giuliana goes to Corrado's room. Giuliana is distraught and begins to disrobe. Initially resisting Corrado's advances, the two make love in his bed. The intimacy, however, does little to relieve Giuliana's sense of isolation. Corrado drives Giuliana to her empty shop, where she remarks that there is something "awful" about reality. Later, Giuliana wanders to a dockside ship where she meets a foreign sailor and asks if the ship takes passengers. She tries to communicate her feelings to him, but he cannot understand her words. Acknowledging the reality of her isolation, she says, "We are all separate."

Later in the daytime, Giuliana is walking with her son near her husband's plant. Valerio notices a nearby smokestack emitting poisonous yellow smoke and wonders if birds are being killed by the toxic emissions. Giuliana tells him that the birds have learned not to fly near the smoke.

Cast

 Monica Vitti as Giuliana
 Richard Harris as Corrado Zeller
 Carlo Chionetti as Ugo
 Xenia Valderi as Linda
 Rita Renoir as Emilia
 Lili Rheims as telescope operator's wife
 Aldo Grotti as Max
 Valerio Bartoleschi as Giuliana's son
 Emanuela Paola Carboni as girl in fable
 Giuliano Missirini as radio telescope operator

Production
The working title of the film was Celeste e verde (Sky blue and green). Shooting took place in the following locations:
Incir De Paolis Studios, Rome, Lazio, Italy (studio)
Ravenna, Emilia-Romagna, Italy
Sardinia, Italy
Budelli, in northern Sardinia, Italy

The film is set in the industrial area of 1960s Ravenna with sprawling new post World War Two factories, industrial machinery and a much polluted river valley. The cinematography is highlighted by pastel colors with flowing white smoke and fog. The sound design blends a foley of industrial and urban sounds with ghostly ship horns and an abstract electronic music score by Gelmetti. This was Antonioni's first colour film, which the director said he wanted to shoot like a painting on a canvas:

As he would do in later film productions, Antonioni went to great lengths in reaching this goal, such as having trees and grass painted white or grey to fit his take on an urban landscape. Andrew Sarris called the red hued pipes and railings "the architecture of anxiety: the reds and blues exclaim as much as they explain".

Another of Red Desert innovating technical effect is extensive use of the telephoto and zoom lenses, even in shots where the actor stands relatively close to the camera. Antonioni wrote, "I worked a lot in Il deserto rosso with the zoom lens to try and get two dimensional effect, to diminish the distance between people and objects, make them seem flattened against each other. Such flattening contributes to the sense of psychological oppression: Giuliana in several shots seems pinned against the wall and the bars between couples seem part of their body."

Themes

Antonioni dismissed simple interpretations of the film as a condemnation of industrialism, saying:

Critical reception
In 1965, a reviewer for TIME lauded Red Desert as "at once the most beautiful, the most simple and the most daring film yet made by" Antonioni, and stated that the director "shows a painterly approach to each frame". 
In 1990, Jonathan Rosenbaum praised the director's "eerie, memorable work with the industrial shapes and colors that surround [Giuliana]; she walks through a science fiction landscape dotted with structures that are both disorienting and full of possibilities." 
In The Daily Telegraph in 2012, Robbie Collin wrote that Antonioni's "bold, modernist angles and thrillingly innovative use of colour (he painted trees and grass to tone with the industrial landscape) make every frame a work of art".
 
Richard Brody of The New Yorker viewed the approach to color as "greatly responsible for the film's emotional and intellectual power" and argued, "The characters in his movies seem thin because their environment is developed so thickly; yet that environment, he suggests, is, though exterior to them, an inextricable part of them."

The Japanese filmmaker Akira Kurosawa cited Red Desert as one of his favorite films.

References

Bibliography

External links
 
 
 Red Desert: In This World – an essay by Mark Le Fanu at The Criterion Collection

1964 films
1964 drama films
1960s Italian-language films
Adultery in films
Films directed by Michelangelo Antonioni
Films produced by Angelo Rizzoli
Films scored by Giovanni Fusco
Films shot in Sardinia
Films with screenplays by Tonino Guerra
French drama films
Golden Lion winners
Italian drama films
1960s Italian films
1960s French films